Elias Martello Curzel (born 12 July 1995), simply known as Elias, is a Brazilian professional footballer who plays as a goalkeeper for Paysandu, on loan from Chapecoense.

Club career

Juventude
Elias was born in Vacaria, Rio Grande do Sul, Elias mainly represented Juventude as a youth, but also with spells at other clubs in his native state. He made his senior debut on 6 August 2014, starting in a 0–1 away loss against Ypiranga for the Copa FGF championship.

Promoted to the main squad ahead of the 2015 season, Elias was initially a backup to fellow youth graduate Airton during the 2015 Campeonato Gaúcho. After the latter's departure to Red Bull Salzburg, he became an undisputed starter in the Série C and contributed with 14 league appearances.

Elias remained as a first-choice in the 2016 season, being one of the club's key units during their Copa do Brasil impressive run to the quarterfinals. He gained national notoriety after Ju's promotion to Série B over Fortaleza, where he widely criticised the opponent's supporters due to their firework display in front of the hotel they were hosted.

On 9 December 2016, Elias renewed his contract until 2018.

Chapecoense
On 20 December 2016, Elias was loaned to Série A club Chapecoense for one year, mainly a replacement to deceased Danilo. A backup to Jandrei, he only appeared rarely but was still bought outright by the club in January 2018.

On 10 May 2018, Elias was loaned to fellow top tier club Vitória for 18 months. The following 29 January, however, after suffering relegation, he terminated his contract and returned to his parent club.

Career statistics

Honours 
Chapecoense
 Campeonato Catarinense: 2017

References

External links
Chapecoense profile 

1995 births
Living people
Sportspeople from Rio Grande do Sul
Brazilian footballers
Association football goalkeepers
Campeonato Brasileiro Série A players
Campeonato Brasileiro Série C players
Esporte Clube Juventude players
Associação Chapecoense de Futebol players
Esporte Clube Vitória players
Paysandu Sport Club players
Azuriz Futebol Clube players
People from Vacaria